A linear response function describes the input-output relationship of a signal transducer, such as a radio turning electromagnetic waves into music or a neuron turning synaptic input into a response. Because of its many applications in information theory, physics and engineering there exist alternative names for specific linear response functions such as susceptibility, impulse response or impedance; see also transfer function. The concept of a Green's function or fundamental solution of an ordinary differential equation is closely related.

Mathematical definition

The explicit term on the right-hand side is the leading order term of a Volterra expansion for the full nonlinear response. If the system in question is highly non-linear, higher order terms in the expansion, denoted by the  dots, become important and the signal transducer cannot adequately be described just by its linear response function.

The complex-valued Fourier transform  of the linear response function is very useful as it describes the output of the system if the input is a sine wave  with frequency . The output reads

with amplitude gain  and phase shift .

Example
Consider a damped harmonic oscillator with input given by an external driving force ,

The complex-valued Fourier transform of the linear response function is given by

The amplitude gain is given by the magnitude of the complex number  and the phase shift  by the arctan  of the imaginary part of the function divided by the real one.

From this representation, we see that for small  the Fourier transform  of the linear response function yields a pronounced maximum ("Resonance") at the frequency . The linear response function for a harmonic oscillator is mathematically identical to that of an RLC circuit. The width of the maximum,  typically is much smaller than  so that the Quality factor  can  be extremely large.

Kubo formula
The exposition of linear response theory, in the context of quantum statistics, can be found in a paper by Ryogo Kubo.  This defines  particularly the Kubo formula, which considers the general case that the "force"  is a perturbation of the basic  operator of the system, the Hamiltonian,  where  corresponds to a measurable quantity as input, while the output  is the perturbation of the thermal expectation of another measurable quantity . The Kubo formula then defines  the quantum-statistical calculation of the susceptibility  by a general formula involving only the mentioned operators. 

As a consequence of the principle of causality the complex-valued function  has poles only in the lower half-plane. The simplest example is once more the damped harmonic oscillator.

See also
Convolution
Green–Kubo relations
Fluctuation theorem
Dispersion (optics)
Lindblad equation
Semilinear response
Green's function
Impulse response
Resolvent formalism
Propagator

References

External links 
 Linear Response Functions in Eva Pavarini, Erik Koch, Dieter Vollhardt, and Alexander Lichtenstein (eds.): DMFT at 25: Infinite Dimensions, Verlag des Forschungszentrum Jülich, 2014 

Equations of physics